Herridge Lake is a lake in the Temagami region of northern Ontario.

Herridge Lake has many bays, inlets, weed beds, and shoals. The lake is 159 feet deep in some spots. There are two lodges/resorts on Herridge Lake: one is Lake Herridge Lodge & Resort, and the other is Papa John's Cottages.

Herridge Lake contains fish populations of walleye, smallmouth bass, northern pike and lake trout.

See also
Lakes of Temagami

Lakes of Temagami
Strathcona Township